Andrea Mangiante (born 1 July 1976) is an Italian water polo player who competed in the 2008 Summer Olympics.

See also
 List of World Aquatics Championships medalists in water polo

References

External links
 

1976 births
Living people
Italian male water polo players
Olympic water polo players of Italy
Water polo players at the 2008 Summer Olympics
World Aquatics Championships medalists in water polo
People from Chiavari
Sportspeople from the Province of Genoa
20th-century Italian people
21st-century Italian people